Diana (born June 2, 1954) is a Brazilian singer, who gained fame in the 1970s. She was born Ana Maria Siqueira Iorio, in Botafogo ward, in Rio de Janeiro city, at 2 June, and raised in the Leblon ward. Her fans have given her the nickname "The Love Singer of Brazil". Her song styles are Jovem Guarda and Brazilian Pop.

Career
She began her career in the late 1960s,  following in the footsteps  of "Jovem Guarda". At 1969, she recorded her first single, "Menti Pra Você"  (I Lied For You) (Side A) and "Sítio do Pica-Pau Amarelo"  (Yellow Woodpecker's Farm) (Side B). In 1970, she recorded another single on the EPIC label, with two songs, called "Não Chore Baby" (Don't Cry Baby) and "Eu Gosto Dele" (I Like Him), produced by Raul Seixas.  Odair José's also recorded a song written by her: "Mundo Feito de Saudade" (World Made By Missings).

Success
Diana continued working and recording in 1971 and 1972, and finally secured a contract with the CBS Label, replacing Wanderléa.
With Raul's production, Diana had hits with the songs "Uma Vez Mais" (One Last Time), "Fatalidade" (Fatality), "Um Mundo Só Pra Nós" (A World Just To We Both), "Porque Brigamos" (Why We Are Tloubed), "Estou Completamente Apaixonada" (I Am Completely in Love) e "Hoje Sonhei Com Você" (Today I Dreamed With You).

New Musical stage
By now Raul Seixas had his own solo career, and dedicated his time to his own productions. In 1974, Diana changed to another label, looking for liberty to record her own compositions. At Polydor Label, she recorded three albums between 1974 and 1976 producing the hits "Foi Tudo Culpa do Amor" (Was All Love's Blame), "Uma Nova Vida" (A New Life) and "Lero-Lero" (Idle Talk).

In 1978 she recorded for an album on the RCA Labelthat included the songs "Vida Que Não Pára" (Life That Doesn't Stop), composed by Odair José, interpreted by Diana.
During the 1980s, Diana records several more singles and albums, including "Pra Sempre" (Forever)

Later years and personal life
At the beginning of their careers, Diana and the singer Odair José married, but after a troubled relationship, they divorced amid significant media attention. Some years later they had a daughter, Clarice.
At this time, she lives in Rio de Janeiro inside, at Região dos Lagos (Lakes Region), Araruama Ville.
Diana plays some concerts around Brazil, but does not attract the same attention she did in the 1970s.

In 2010, Diana adopted the new stage name Dianah. She declared the intention to record a new CD, a live DVD and to release an autobiography.

References

1970 births
Living people
Musicians from Rio de Janeiro (city)
Brazilian pop singers
21st-century Brazilian singers
21st-century Brazilian women singers
People from Araruama